The Aubette is a small river of Seine-Maritime département. It begins near Saint-Aubin-Épinay, and flows along the town Darnétal. It is joined by the river Robec before it flows into the Seine near Rouen. In the 19th century, the Aubette had a hundred mills, textiles, paper mills, etc. Although the river Robec is longer than the Aubette (9 km) it is considered to be a tributary of Aubette.

References

Rivers of France
Rivers of Seine-Maritime
Rivers of Normandy